Acutitornus is a genus of moth in the family Gelechiidae.

Species
 Acutitornus kalahariensis Janse, 1958
 Acutitornus leucostola Janse, 1958
 Acutitornus liebenbergi Janse, 1963
 Acutitornus munda Janse, 1951
 Acutitornus munroi Janse, 1958

References

Apatetrinae
Moth genera